A double-barrelled name is a type of compound surname, typically featuring two words (occasionally more), often joined by a hyphen. Examples of some notable people with double-barrelled names include Winnie Madikizela-Mandela and Sacha Baron Cohen.

In the  Western tradition of surnames, there are several types of double surname (or double-barrelled surname). If the two names are joined with a hyphen, it may also be called a hyphenated surname. The word "barrel" possibly refers to the barrel of a shotgun, as in "double-barreled shotgun".

In British tradition, a double surname is heritable, usually taken to preserve a family name that would have become extinct due to the absence of male descendants bearing the name, connected to the inheritance of a family estate.  Examples include Harding-Rolls and Stopford Sackville.

In Hispanic tradition, double surnames are the norm, and not an indication of social status. A person used to take the (first) surname of their father, followed by the (first) surname of their mother (i.e. their maternal grandfather's surname). In Spain, parents can choose the order of the last names of their children since the year 2000, with the provision that all children from the same couple need to have them in the same order. The double surname itself is not heritable. These names are combined without hyphen (but optionally combined using y, which means "and" in Spanish). In addition to this, there are heritable double surnames (apellidos compuestos) which are mostly but not always combined with a hyphen. Hyphenated last names usually correspond to both last names of one of the parents but both last names can be hyphenated, so some Hispanics may legally have two double-barrelled last names corresponding to both last names of both parents. Many Spanish scholars use a pen name where they enter a hyphen between their last names to avoid being misrepresented in citations.

In German tradition, double surnames can be taken upon marriage, written with or without hyphen, combining the husband's surname with the wife's. (More recently the sequence has become optional under some legislations.) These double surnames are "alliance names" (Allianznamen).

British tradition

Many double-barrelled names are written without a hyphen, causing confusion as to whether the surname is double-barrelled or not. Notable persons with unhyphenated double-barrelled names include prime minister David Lloyd George (who used the hyphen when appointed to the peerage), politician Iain Duncan Smith, composers Ralph Vaughan Williams and Andrew Lloyd Webber, military historian B. H. Liddell Hart, soldier and translator C. K. Scott Moncrieff, evolutionary biologist John Maynard Smith, astronomer Robert Hanbury Brown, actresses Kristin Scott Thomas and Helena Bonham Carter (the last of whom has said the hyphen is optional, and indeed several of her relatives use it in their names), and comedian Sacha Baron Cohen (whose cousins, psychologist Simon Baron-Cohen and film-maker Ash Baron-Cohen, use the hyphen in their names).

In Wales, many families have double-barrelled surnames. The preponderance in Wales of only a few surnames (such as Jones, Williams, and Davies) led to the usage of double-barrelled names to avoid confusion of unrelated but similarly-named people. Lloyd George, Vaughan Williams and Llewelyn Davies are examples of this phenomenon.

A few British noble or gentry families have "triple-barrelled" surnames (e.g. Anstruther-Gough-Calthorpe; Cave-Browne-Cave; Elliot-Murray-Kynynmound; Heathcote-Drummond-Willoughby; Smith-Dorrien-Smith; Vane-Tempest-Stewart; Twisleton-Wykeham-Fiennes). These indicate prima facie the inheritance of multiple estates and thus the consolidation of great wealth. These are sometimes created when the legator has a double-barrelled name and the legatee has a single surname, or vice versa. Nowadays, such names are almost always abbreviated in everyday usage to a single or double-barrelled version. For example, actress Isabella Anstruther-Gough-Calthorpe calls herself Isabella Calthorpe. There is at least one example of an unhyphenated triple-barrelled surname: that of the Montagu Douglas Scott family, to which the Dukes of Buccleuch belong. 

There are even a few "quadruple-barrelled" surnames (e.g. Hepburn-Stuart-Forbes-Trefusis, Hovell-Thurlow-Cumming-Bruce, Montagu-Stuart-Wortley-Mackenzie, Plunkett-Ernle-Erle-Drax, Lane Fox Pitt-Rivers, and Stirling-Home-Drummond-Moray). The surname of the extinct family of the Dukes of Buckingham and Chandos was the quintuple-barrelled Temple-Nugent-Brydges-Chandos-Grenville.

Captain Leone Sextus Denys Oswolf Fraudatifilius Tollemache-Tollemache de Orellana Plantagenet Tollemache-Tollemache is sometimes incorrectly quoted as the man with the most ever "barrels" in his surname (six). The UK Registry Office confirms that his surname was 'Tollemache-Tollemache' and the other names are forenames.

Traditions in Iberian Peninsula

In Spain, surnames are strictly regulated by the Civil Code and the Law of the Civil Registry. When a person is born, the law requires them to take the first surname of the father and then the first surname of the mother. Thus, when D. Julio Iglesias de la Cueva and Dª Isabel Preysler Arrastía had a son called Enrique, he legally was Enrique Iglesias Preysler. On the other hand, actual double-barrelled names exist (called apellidos compuestos), such as Calvo-Sotelo or López-Portillo. For example, Leopoldo Calvo-Sotelo y Bustelo is the son of Leopoldo Calvo Sotelo and Mercedes Bustelo Vázquez. Such names may reflect the attempt to preserve a family name that would be lost without this practice. The creation of such names must be approved by request to the Ministry of the Interior.

Spain's hidalgo families often used double-barrelled names in conjunction with the nobiliary particle "de" (of). Toponymic family such as the surnames García de las Heras, Pérez de Arce or López de Haro combine a regular family name with the branch of the family. For example, the "López" branch hailing from the Rioja town of Haro, La Rioja. Surnames associated with Spanish nobility follow the same custom, such as the Álvarez de Toledo, Ramírez de Arellano or Fernández de Córdoba. In these cases, the first surname indicates the original name of the family, whereas the second surname denotes the nobiliary fief of that family. In this context, the conjunction "de" (of) reflects that the family used to be the feudal lords of that place. Thus, the Ramírez were the lords of the village of Arellano, in Navarra.

In Portugal, where most of the population have two to four surnames (apelidos de família), the practice of using a double combination of surnames is very common. The person can either use a paternal and a maternal surname combined (Aníbal Cavaco Silva) or use a double last name that has been passed down through one of the parents (António Lobo Antunes). The last surname (normally the paternal one) is usually considered the "most important", but people may choose to use another one, often favouring the more sonant or less common of their surnames in their daily or professional life (such as Manuel Alegre or José Manuel Barroso, who is known in Portugal by his double surname Durão Barroso). The use of more than two surnames in public life is less common, but not unusual (see Sophia de Mello Breyner Andresen). Combined surnames of two gentry families from Portugal are also prevalent, such as Nogueira Ferrão.

One historic early aviator, Alberto Santos-Dumont, is known to have not only often used an equals sign (=) between his two surnames in place of a hyphen, but also seems to have preferred that practice, to display equal respect for his father's French ethnicity and the Brazilian nationality of his mother.

Continental Germanic tradition

In Germany, a double surname is generally joined with a single hyphen. Other types of double surnames are not accepted by German name law. However, exceptions are made for immigrants and for marriages where the double surname already was the official name of one partner before marriage.  A 1993 law forbids surnames with more than two components. Prior to this, it was permitted for adults (e.g., Simone Greiner-Petter-Memm and formerly Elisabeth Noelle-Neumann-Maier-Leibniz) but their children would not inherit the name. The 1993 ban was upheld by the Constitutional Court in 2009.  The crew members of the famous First World War light cruiser  were allowed to add the name Emden with a hyphen to their surname as a special honour after World War I.  There is the possibility that one partner can combine both names by a hyphen. Thus, one of them then bears a double name (Doppelname). (Herr Schmidt and Frau Meyer-Schmidt (or Frau Schmidt-Meyer); the children have to be called Schmidt). Only one partner can take this option, making it impossible for both partners to have Doppelnamen (thus, there would be no Herr Meyer-Schmidt and Frau Meyer-Schmidt). Until the late twentieth century it was only possible for a woman to add her maiden name onto that of her husband’s, not the other way round, therefore Ms. Schmidt would become Mrs. Meyer-Schmidt. This tradition has continued for the most part.

In Switzerland, double surnames are traditionally written with a hyphen and combine the surnames of a married couple with the husband's surname in first place and the wife's second. This double name is called "alliance name". The first name as such, however, is the official family name, which will be inherited by their legitimate children. So, for example, if Werner Stauffacher is married to Gertrud Baumgarten, both can use the name Stauffacher-Baumgarten. Their children, however, bear only the surname Stauffacher. Prominent bearers of an alliance name are Micheline Calmy-Rey (former Federal Minister for Foreign Affairs), Eveline Widmer-Schlumpf (former Federal Minister for Finance), and Johann Schneider-Ammann (Federal Minister for the Economy). While it is traditional for the family name to be that of the husband, either name may be chosen, with the person who changes their surname being allowed to hyphenate on their original name. Alternatively, both partners may keep their own name and choose which of the surnames is passed on to children at birth of their first child.

Doubling of surnames is also practised by the Dutch. An example is the name of Dutch footballer Jan Vennegoor of Hesselink. According to The Guardian, his name derives from "the 17th century, when two farming families in the Enschede area of the Netherlands intermarried. Both the Vennegoor and Hesselink names carried equal social weight, and so – rather than choose between them – they chose to use both. 'Of' in Dutch translates to 'or', which means that a strict translation of his name reads Jan Vennegoor or Hesselink." Some of these Dutch surnames also survive in South Africa, for example, the rugby player Rohan Janse van Rensburg's surname is Janse van Rensburg, not only van Rensburg (which is itself an existing surname). In addition, it was common for wives to be known by their husband's surname (first) and her original/birth name (second) hyphenated. Nowadays, couples can choose any combination of surnames for official use (although their legal name will remain unchanged). Most prevalent remains for the wife to either use a hyphenated surname or use her original/birth name. Few husbands use a hyphenated surname. All children of a couple need to go by the same surname (either their father's or their mother's); and won't normally have a hyphenated surname.

Scandinavia

Denmark has a tradition of double surnames originating in the 19th century. This was a result of two naming acts obliging commoners to adopt heritable surnames, passed first for the Duchy of Schleswig in 1771, and then for Denmark proper in 1828. Most people chose their patronymic as their heritable surname, resulting in an overwhelming dominance of a few surnames.

To reduce the risk of mistaken identity, many Danes started using their mothers' original/birth names as a heritable middle name (similar to the Russian or Hispanic system), rather than as a second given name (as in the Anglo-Saxon system). One example is three successive prime ministers of Denmark all sharing the same last name, Rasmussen, so they are usually referred to by their middle name: Nyrup, Fogh and Løkke, respectively.

Currently, the Danish order of names invariably places the patronymic -sen at the end, regardless of whether that name has been passed down by the father or mother, or adopted through marriage. Unlike the Russian or Hispanic systems, this surname-style middle name is not considered a proper last name in official documents, unless hyphenated into one compound name.

Poland

In Poland, a double surname ("complex surname") is generally joined with a hyphen. Polish surnames (singular), like those in most of Europe, are hereditary and generally patrilineal, i.e., passed from the father on to his children. A married woman usually adopts her husband's name. However, other combinations are legally possible. The wife may keep her original/birth name (literally: "maiden surname") or add her husband's surname to hers, thus creating a double name (nazwisko złożone). A married man can also adopt his wife's surname, or add it to his. Polish triple-barreled surnames are known to exist; an example is the one borne by Ludwik Kos-Rabcewicz-Zubkowski, a university professor and writer, living in Canada.

Russia
In Russia, double-barreled surnames are somewhat uncommon, but normal and accepted practice, often associated with some families of note wishing to preserve both of their lineages. Federal law #143-FZ "On Civil State Acts" explicitly allows double-barreled names in its Article 18, but limits such compound surnames to two parts only.

Статья 18. Запись фамилии, имени и отчества ребенка при государственной регистрации рождения

1. При государственной регистрации рождения фамилия ребенка записывается по фамилии его родителей. При разных фамилиях родителей по соглашению родителей ребенку присваивается фамилия отца, фамилия матери или двойная фамилия, образованная посредством присоединения фамилий отца и матери друг к другу в любой последовательности, если иное не предусмотрено законами субъектов Российской Федерации. Не допускается изменение последовательности присоединения фамилий отца и матери друг к другу при образовании двойных фамилий у полнородных братьев и сестер. Двойная фамилия ребенка может состоять не более чем из двух слов, соединенных при написании дефисом.

Translated: 

Article 18

1. During state registration of birth, the surname of the child is recorded according to the surname of his parents. With different surnames of the parents, by agreement of the parents, the child is assigned the surname of the father, the surname of the mother or a double surname formed by joining the surnames of the father and mother to each other in any sequence, unless otherwise provided by the laws of the constituent entities of the Russian Federation. It is not allowed to change the sequence of joining the surnames of the father and mother to each other when forming double surnames for full brothers and sisters. The double surname of the child may consist of no more than two words, connected when written with a hyphen.

Turkish tradition
Turkish tradition offers options to couples after the marriage for the naming conventions. Renewing the national identity card to reflect the changes has two options, one is to use the man's surname for the newly formed family's surname, the second is to use two surnames for the family noting that one is the bride's original/birth name, the latter is the groom's surname. This highlights the equal importance of men and women in Turkish history since 2008, by giving legal opportunity to use whichever is preferable for partners.

French-Canadian tradition
Until the late 19th century, some families had a nom-dit tradition. This was a family nickname (literally a "said name"). The origins of the noms-dits were various. Some noms-dits were the war-name of the first settler, while he was a soldier: Hébert dit Jolicœur (Pretty Heart, cf. Braveheart), Thomas dit Tranchemontagne (mountain chopper). Some denoted the place of origin of the first settler: Langevin (Anjou), Barbeau dit Poitevin (Poitou). Others denoted a characteristic of the person or of his dwelling: Lacourse, Lépine, Larivière.

Recent developments
Since the late 20th century, increasingly permissive legislation on the inheritance of surnames in Western countries has led to the emergence of non-traditional or ad hoc combined surnames.
For example, Hispanic American politician Antonio Villar and his wife Corina Raigosa adopted the "blended" surname Villaraigosa upon their marriage in 1987.

In Belgium and Germany, member states of the European Union, courts have refused to register children under the surname given according to a foreign naming tradition.

In France, a practice abolished in 2010 was to use two consecutive hyphens (--) (not the same as a "long hyphen" or dash, or with a double hyphen) to distinguish between recently formed double surnames and ancient hyphenated family names. The use of double surnames is legal but not customary. Children traditionally take on their father's surname (or, more recently, optionally their mother's).

In Canada, especially Quebec, it is common for children born since the 1970s to bear both parents' surnames, with no established rules as to whether the father's or mother's name should come first. (In Quebec, under the provisions of the Civil Code enacted in 1980, both spouses must retain their original surnames upon marriage.) This situation was frequent enough that naming laws had to be amended in the early 1990s when those with double surnames began to marry, and wished themselves to give their children double surnames. In such cases, any combination involving at most two elements of the father's or the mother's surname is permitted.

Finland liberalised their name law in 2017, allowing double surnames in some cases, either hyphenated or as such. A double name can be formed when marrying or getting children, combining the surnames of the spouses or the parents, respectively. Double names can be combined by taking one part of each. Either spouse or both can take a double name. Based on a family's foreign name tradition, children can get surnames also based on a grandparent's surname. The former law, from 1985, allowed either taking their spouse's surname and optionally continuing using their own surname as a hyphen-joined prefix, but formally they did not get a double surname and their children got the spouse's surname.

With the rise of same-sex marriage, many same-sex couples have hyphenated each other's names upon marriage. For instance, American attorney and former chair of the Libertarian National Committee Joe Bishop-Henchman changed his surname from Henchman upon marriage to his husband Ethan Bishop, who also changed his surname to Bishop-Henchman at that time.

Non-Western surname traditions

Most Chinese surnames are a single character. However, in modern times, some families are now combining the surnames of the parents to create new names. Some examples of notable double-barrelled surnames include the Changchien clan in Taiwan. This practice is different from having a Chinese compound surname, where more than one character is used in a surname.

In 2007, PRC officials suggested that parents should be encouraged to create two-syllable (two-character)  surnames for  their children by combining their  parents' (one-syllable) surnames; this could make people's names more unique, and "could help solve the problem of widely recurring names".

In India, double surnames are comparatively common, especially in Bengal, examples including Roy Chaudhury (sometimes written as Chowdhury), Ghosh Dastidar and Das Gupta. In recent years, a few notable married women have been keeping their original/birth surnames resulting in a double-barrelled name such as Arati Ankalikar-Tikekar, Padmaja Phenany Joglekar.

In Nigeria, a double barrelled surname is adopted when an aristocratic woman marries a lower ranked man. It also occurs when a ruling family adopts the forename of their patriarch as part of their surname to distinguish themselves from others that might share their surname. An example of the former is that of the Vaughan-Richards family, a branch of the family of the Nigerian royal-turned-American emancipated slave Prince Scipio Vaughan, who maintain their mother's last name as well as their father's. An example of the latter is that of the royal family of King Adeniji Adele of Lagos, who are distinguished from their numerous Adele cousins by the use of the double barrelled name Adeniji-Adele.

Filipino naming tradition

The Filipino naming tradition is derived from the Hispanic system but was influenced by the American (Anglo-Saxon) naming tradition when the Philippines became a United States colony in 1901.
A child will customarily carry the mother's original/birth name as the middle name and carry the father's surname. When a woman marries, she keeps her original/birth surname and adds the husband's surname, but does not typically hyphenate it. So, when Maria Santos Aguon marries José Lujan Castro, her name becomes Maria Aguon Castro and their children will typically carry the middle name Aguon, and the surname Castro.

For Filipinos, the middle name is usually the maternal surname, which is the original/birth surname of a person's mother. The use of the maternal surname as middle name is from American influence, where Filipinos adopted English naming customs, when they once used Spanish naming customs, that used two surnames (paternal and maternal) joined with the particle y (or e before ), which remains in use but became restricted to  very formal purposes, police records and legal proceedings. In the original Spanish naming system, the middle name corresponds to the paternal surname, not the maternal surname as used in the Philippines today. For Filipinos, this middle name (or the maternal surname) is usually being abbreviated in less formal communications to a middle initial. Thus, a person with the full name Juan Santos Macaraig, with Santos the middle name in the present order, may become Juan S. Macaraig with the middle name abbreviated, and Juan Macaraig y Santos in the Spanish system, such as those used in names on police records, especially those seen on name placards held by a convicted person on official mug shots. The Philippine system, using "given name-middle name-surname" order (or "Christian name-mother's surname-father's surname") coincidentally follows the Portuguese naming system that uses two surnames, the first being maternal and the second being paternal.

But, the maternal surname may not be the middle name at some cases. It may be a second given name, like what the term really means, as in Jose P. Laurel, where "P." (a middle initial)  corresponds to Paciano.

In illegitimate children, the middle name is the original/birth surname of the father, and the middle name (maternal surname) of the mother as surname. But the surname becomes of the father's surname upon legal and administrative acknowledgment by his/her father. The child of a single father takes no middle name, even when the mother's identity is known.

To illustrate that, the daughter of an unmarried couple named Ana Cristina dela Cruz Manansala and Jose Maria Panganiban Lozada, named '"Maria Cristina'", will be named Maria Cristina Manansala dela Cruz (or Ma. Cristina M. dela Cruz), with Ana Cristina's middle name,  dela Cruz, as surname. But once Jose Maria wants to acknowledge her as his child legally and administratively, Maria Cristina will take the surname Lozada, but keep the maternal surname Manansala as middle name, thus, Maria Cristina Manansala Lozada (or Ma. Cristina M. Lozada). As the daughter of only Jose Maria, Maria Cristina will be rather called Maria Cristina Lozada or Ma. Cristina Lozada, even when the mother is known.

In married women, the middle name usually corresponds to the original/birth surname, but on professional society, women usually add the husband's surname after their original/birth name, keeping the maternal surname. A married woman may decline taking the husband's surname and keep her original/birth name as no Philippine law compels women to take her husband's surname. Thus, a woman named Maria Concepcion Perez Limchauco (or Ma. Concepcion P. Limchauco), once marrying Juan Pablo Sanchez Marasigan (or Juan Pablo S. Marasigan) may take the name Maria Concepcion Perez Limchauco-Marasigan (or Ma. Concepcion P.  Limchauco-Marasigan), maintaining the maternal surname Perez, Maria Concepcion Limchauco Marasigan (or Ma. Concepcion L. Marasigan), taking the original/birth surname Limchauco as middle name and Marasigan as married surname, or keep her original/birth names, remaining Maria Concepcion Perez Limchauco.

See also 
 Bilingual tautological names
 Double name
 Dual naming
 Name blending
 List of double placenames

References 

Surname